Substrate channeling is the passing of the intermediary metabolic product of one enzyme directly to another enzyme or active site without its release into solution. When several consecutive enzymes of a metabolic pathway channel substrates between themselves, this is called a metabolon. Channeling can make a metabolic pathway more rapid and efficient than it would be if the enzymes were randomly distributed in the cytosol, or prevent the release of unstable intermediates. It can also protect an intermediate from being consumed by competing reactions catalyzed by other enzymes.

Channeling can occur in several ways. One possibility, which occurs in the pyruvate dehydrogenase complex, is by a substrate being attached to a flexible arm that moves between several active sites (not very likely). Another possibility is by two active sites being connected by a tunnel through the protein and the substrate moving through the tunnel; this is seen in tryptophan synthase. A third possibility is by a charged region on the surface of the enzyme acting as a pathway or "electrostatic highway" to guide a substrate that has the opposite charge from one active site to another. This is seen in the bifunctional enzyme dihydrofolate reductase-thymidylate synthase. The channeling of aminoacyl-tRNA for protein synthesis in vivo has been also reported.

A presence of channel in enzyme structure is rather common feature as more than 68% of enzymes have active site access channels. Enzyme channels can be identified and characterized by MOLEonline software.

See also

 Enzyme kinetics
 Enzyme assay
 Enzyme catalysis

References

Enzyme kinetics